KATK (740 AM) is a radio station broadcasting a Mexican music format. Licensed to Carlsbad, New Mexico, United States, the station serves the Santa Fe area.  The station is currently owned by Carlsbad Radio, Inc. and features programming from Westwood One. The stations logo is very similar to the La Raza stations that are owned by the Spanish Broadcasting System

References

External links
Carlsbad Radio stations
La Raza 93.9 Facebook

ATK
Radio stations established in 1950
1950 establishments in New Mexico